Acianthera pardipes  is a species of orchid.

pardipes